Koyalchal Sanjay Gandhi Memorial (abbreviated KSGM) College, Nirsa is a Co-educational degree College and is permanently affiliated to Binod Bihari Mahto Koyalanchal University, Dhanbad Aided by Government of Jharkhand and Registered by University Grants Commission  under 2F and 12B. Accredited to NAAC Grade-A offers general education in all three faculties of Arts, Science and Commerce. Honours teaching offered in almost all subjects.

The Intermediate courses are run under Jharkhand Academic Council, Ranchi and The degree courses are run under Binod Bihari Mahto Koyalanchal University, Dhanbad.

History 
This degree College was established in the year 1980 and named Koyalchal Sanjay Gandhi Memorial (abbreviated KSGM) College by the vision of by Late. Sri. C.N. Maharaja (philanthropist) and Sri. K.S. Chatterjee.

Location 

KSGM College is located near the Govt. Middle School and High School Nirsa. One can reach the site from Main Road NH 19 with a walk-able distance of 1 km or by any commute available.

Gallery

References

External links 
Official website

Colleges affiliated to Binod Bihari Mahto Koyalanchal University
Universities and colleges in Jharkhand
Education in Dhanbad